Cristian Călin Panin (born 9 June 1978) is a retired Romanian footballer who played as a right back or left back. He is currently the team manager at CFR Cluj.

Club career
Cristan Panin was born on 9 June 1978 in Arad, Romania, beginning his senior career in 1997 at local club UTA in Liga II, helping the team promote to Liga I in the 2001–02 season, a competition in which he made his debut on 18 August 2002 under coach Ionuț Popa in a 2–1 loss against Național București. By the end of the season The Old Lady finished on the 16th place, relegating back Liga II where he spent one more season, before leaving after coach Ilie Stan wanted to bring new players at the club. During the summer of 2004 he moved to newly Liga I promoted team, CFR Cluj where he played 9 games in the 2005 Intertoto Cup when the team reached the final. In the 2007–08 season he helped CFR win The Double, these being the first trophies in the club's history, being used by coach Ioan Andone in 28 league matches in which he scored one goal. He spent a total of 9 seasons wearing the Feroviarii's shirt and although numerous players, including Swedish international Mikael Dorsin, have attempted to replace him, he still remained a key player for the team, helping the club win another two titles in the 2009–10 and 2011–12 seasons, being used in 29 matches in the first one and in 21 in the second one, also helping the club win another two Cupa României and two Supercupa României. Panin made his last Liga I appearance on 26 May 2013 in a 3–3 against Astra Giurgiu, having a total of 217 appearances and 5 goals scored in the competition, also he played in 9 Champions League group stage matches and in 10 Europa League matches.

International career
Cristian Panin played two games for Romania, making his debut on 19 November 2008 when coach Victor Pițurcă introduced him in the 25th minute to replace George Ogăraru in a friendly against Georgia which ended with a 2–1 victory. His second game was a 3–1 victory against Faroe Islands at the 2010 World Cup qualifiers.

After retiring
After retiring in 2013, Panin joined the technical staff of CFR Cluj as a team manager. Panin had performed several club functions during his time in staff of the club.

Honours
UTA Arad
Divizia B: 2001–02
CFR Cluj
Liga I: 2007–08, 2009–10, 2011–12
Cupa României: 2007–08, 2008–09, 2009–10
Supercupa României: 2009, 2010
UEFA Intertoto Cup runner-up: 2005

References

External links

1978 births
Living people
Sportspeople from Arad, Romania
Romanian footballers
Romania international footballers
Association football defenders
CFR Cluj players
FC UTA Arad players
Liga I players
Liga II players